Amamapare is a port in Mimika Regency, Central Papua, Indonesia; National Geographic refer to it as a port town. It is an important industrial centre and slurry containing copper-gold concentrate is delivered by three pipelines from Grasberg mine over 70 miles away. In Amamapare it is dewatered, filtered and dried and then shipped to smelters around the world. The facilities at the port also include a coal-fired power station, which supplies the Grasberg operations.

Climate
Amamapare has a tropical rainforest climate (Af) with heavy to very heavy rainfall year-round.

References

External links 
 Port of Amamapare in Ministry of Transportation website

A
A